A town square is an open public space commonly found in the heart of a traditional town used for community gatherings.

Town square may also refer to:

Places
 Town Square (Dubai), United Arab Emirates 
 Town Square (Las Vegas), upscale center development in Enterprise, Nevada, United States
 Town Square (Ljubljana), Slovenia
 Town Square (Saint Paul), mixed-use complex in Saint Paul, Minnesota, United States
 Old Town Square, Prague, Czech Republic
 Richmond Town Square, shopping mall in Richmond Heights, Ohio, United States
 George Washington Memorial Park (Jackson, Wyoming), United States, known locally as "Town Square"

Other uses
 Town square test, threshold test for a free society
Urban park type
Townsquare Media, an American owner of several radio stations

See also
 Town Hall Square, Tallinn
 City square (disambiguation)
 Public Square (disambiguation)
 Market Square (disambiguation)
 The Square (disambiguation)
 Square (disambiguation)
 Piazza (disambiguation)
 Plaza (disambiguation)